The Mauritius Command is the fourth naval historical novel in the Aubrey-Maturin series by Patrick O'Brian, first published in 1977.

Aubrey is married and the father of twin girls, owner of a cottage with a fine observatory he built. He is more than ready to be back at sea. He and Stephen Maturin join a convoy charged with taking two well-located islands in the Indian Ocean from the French. The mission provides scope for each man to advance in his specialty.

A review written at first publication found the novel to be written in "language deep with detail and the poetry of fact", appreciating the period detail. A later review, written at the reissue, finds the author a graceful writer but sees a difficulty with the novel's structure, building to climaxes that do not occur. Others writing at that time saw the novel more as part of the long series, with humour, erudition and "impeccable period detail".

Plot summary

Jack Aubrey and Sophia Williams are married and the parents of twin girls. They live at Ashgrove Cottage on his half-pay, not enough to support fellow navy men in the household. Sophia's mother has lost her money, including Sophia's portion, and now lives with them. They have Cecelia, Sophia's young niece in their household as well. As much as he loves Sophia, Aubrey is ready to go to sea again. Stephen Maturin comes to call, and soon after Aubrey's orders are delivered from the port Admiral. He is given command of the 38-gun frigate HMS Boadicea. At Plymouth, he picks up orders and Mr R T Farquhar, a political gentleman. He is to sail to the station at Cape Town where the ships of a convoy will meet. Not long away from home, they meet with the French ship Hébé which is escorting a captured merchant ship. The Boadicea captures both ships. Aubrey sends the prizes to Gibraltar. The timely capture allows the ship to send letters home, gain a French cook and the Hébé's English prisoners, all able seamen. The long journey in the Atlantic gives Aubrey time to bring the crew of the Boadicea up to his standards of efficiency in gunnery and gives Maturin and Farquhar time to develop strategies.

On arrival, Aubrey meets Admiral Bertie who confirms Aubrey's position as Commodore and authorises him to hoist his broad pendant ('broad pennant' in some editions). He receives formal instructions to disrupt French interests in the region, and ultimately to take the islands of Mauritius and La Réunion. The convoy includes Lord Clonfert of the Otter, an Englishman with an Irish title; Captain Corbett of Néréide; and Captain Pym of the Sirius. Corbett sailed from the West Indies station with some of Aubrey's followers aboard. Bonden, Killick and others join, after Aubrey trades men into Corbett's ship. Corbett is capable but a flogging captain. Bertie advises Aubrey that Clonfert and Corbett are not on good terms with each other.

For the first 2,000 miles of the voyage to the islands, Aubrey switches his pendant to the elderly 64-gun ship of the line HMS Raisonnable. The Caroline is taken; Corbett sails her, christened HMS Bourbonnaise, with dispatches to Cape Town and England. The rest of the convoy returns to Cape Town. Aubrey shifts back to HMS Boadicea and sails upon news of more merchant ships taken by the French. The convoy is caught in a major hurricane, whence it sails back to Cape Town for repairs, receiving the first mail in many months. Sophia's letters are water-damaged, so Aubrey does not understand her full message.

La Réunion capitulates almost without loss after a landing by Army troops joined by sepoys under the British East India Company, all under the active and decisive Lieutenant Colonel Harry Keating, with ships of the convoy on both sides of the island. Their path is eased by Maturin's propaganda and political meetings to explain why the locals should be happy to accept the British, with Farquhar as interim Governor. Mauritius proves more challenging. Maturin has an accident boarding HMS Néréide, which is part of the force sent to Île de la Passe. He is seriously injured, so he observes Clonfert during this recuperation aboard. The action is successful. Maturin is put down on Mauritius to continue his work. A small group of ships, under the command of Captain Pym, puts soldiers on Mauritius to staff the fort. The French appear with three ships Bellone, Minerve, Victor and two Indiamen Ceylon and Windham. They boldly attack the fort and then sail into the port; the British are caught unprepared but decide to attack. The struggle goes on for days with heavy casualties and in the end two British ships run aground. Sirius and Magicienne are burnt to prevent their capture, and Iphigenia and the fort at Île de la Passe are abandoned to be retaken by the French. Néréide is taken and Clonfert is severely wounded in the neck and head by a splinter. A messenger vessel, with Maturin aboard, reaches La Réunion to inform Aubrey of the losses and the failed attack on Port Southeast.

Boadicea sails through the night to check Île de la Passe, to see it under French control, then chases Manche and Vénus in a vain attempt to separate them. After contacting Pullings, who has the guns of Windham aboard Emma, Aubrey believes his fortunes have changed. Then Captain Corbett re-joins at St Denis, with HMS Africaine. Chasing the French during the night, Africaine clashes with the Astrée and the French Iphigenie. The encounter goes badly, and Corbett is killed during the fight after being wounded, possibly by his own oppressed men. The French capture the Africaine, but leave it dismasted when the Boadicea bears down on them; Astrée refuses an engagement. Joined by the Otter and Staunch, the flotilla reaches La Réunion where refit of the Africaine is the Commodore's top priority.

Maturin and Bonden return from Mauritius with news that HMS Bombay is nearby, in a running fight with both the French Vénus and Victor. The Boadicea engages the French ships. Aubrey makes use of volunteer crew from the refitting HMS Africaine to board and capture Bombay and Vénus. During the encounter the French Commodore Hamelin is killed. Aubrey plans how to finish the battle, once the remaining French ships will be ready to sail, and his ships are ready to fight again, when they reach Mauritius. Keating is equally ready. The Emma nears the Boadicea, with many other British sails in view. Tom Pullings comes aboard with the Gazette announcing the birth of a son to Sophia. Aubrey is ecstatic at the news. Then he opens Admiral Bertie's letter ordering him to join the fleet at Rodriguez, where he will be on HMS Illustrious, and the Army led by General Abercrombie. The final invasion, based on Aubrey and Keating's original plan, is almost without bloodshed. The French capitulate after being given honourable terms.

Maturin finds that Clonfert, at the military hospital in Port Louis since the battle, has committed suicide, unable to face Jack Aubrey, whom he considers a rival. A ceremonial dinner is given at Government House. Maturin spreads rumours about Aubrey's father soon to have power in London, via Mr Peters, which rumours are believed by Bertie. The Admiral gives Aubrey the honour of taking the dispatches of this success aboard the Boadicea to England.

Characters

In England
Jack Aubrey: Captain in the Royal Navy and appointed commodore during this story. Also captain of HMS Boadicea.
Stephen Maturin: ship's surgeon, friend to Jack, natural philosopher and intelligence officer.
Sophia Aubrey: Jack's wife, his true love and mother of his children; a beautiful and strong woman.
Charlotte and Fanny: Jack and Sophie's twin, infant daughters, perhaps six months old when he leaves.
Baby boy Aubrey: Son born to Sophia while this mission takes place; news is in the Naval Gazette.
Cecelia: Young daughter of Mrs William's middle daughter. Niece of Sophie and Jack, living with them at Ashgrove Cottage.
Mrs Williams: Jack Aubrey's mother in law, now bankrupt and living with her daughter Sophia.
Bessie: cook at Ashgrove Cottage until Mrs Williams abruptly dismisses her without a good word, for touching the mushrooms carefully collected as a gift to the Aubreys by Maturin, a man unknown to her.
Lady Clonfert: wife of Captain Lord Clonfert, seeking passage to join him at the Cape.

At the Cape
Robert Townsend Farquhar, Esquire: temporary governor of La Réunion, trained in the law, skilled in politics, no ear for music, good chess player. He is R T Farquhar when picked up at Plymouth, but oddly William Farquhar, Governor-designate in Admiral Bertie's orders to Aubrey.
Mr Lemuel Akers: First lieutenant in HMS Boadicea detached to sail HMS Hyaena to Gibraltar.
Mr Seymour: Second lieutenant in HMS Boadicea, acting first lieutenant after Akers parts company.
Mr Trollope: Third lieutenant in HMS Boadicea, acting second after Akers parts company.
Mr Johnson: master's mate in HMS Boadicea, Acting Lieutenant after Akers parts company, appointment confirmed at Cape Town.
Mr Richardson: Midshipman in Boadicea, nicknamed Spotted Dick, skilled in mathematics, partner to Aubrey in navigation. Later he takes the aviso Pearl to Rodriguez island.
Mr Buchan: Master in HMS Boadicea who is killed by cannon fire from French ship Astrée.
Mr John Fellowes: Bosun of the Boadicea.
Admiral Bertie: Admiral in Simon's Town, for Cape Town station of the Royal Navy, with an eye to financial gain and baronetcy.
Mr Peter: Secretary to Aubrey, from Simon's Town. He is connected to Admiral Bertie, serving as a spy for him aboard the squadron, as Maturin quickly realizes and, at the end, uses to his and Aubrey's advantage.
William McAdam: Surgeon in HMS Néréide, specialist in diseases of the mind, knows Clonfert and knew his father as well.
Golovnin: Russian fleet lieutenant, captain of sloop Diana caught at Cape Town when Russia joined with France for a while (thus an enemy to England), slipped away without harm.
Barret Bonden: Jack Aubrey's Coxswain, who joined him at Cape Town.
Preserved Killick: Jack Aubrey's steward who joined him at Cape Town.

At La Réunion and Mauritius
Lieutenant Colonel Harry Keating: British army commander of the 56th Regiment of Foot, leader of all army and sepoy units.
Colonel Fraser: British army officer leading a brigade in the attack on La Réunion, arrived on the Sirius.
Colonel McLeod: British army officer leading a brigade in the attack on La Réunion, arrived on the Boadicea.
Colonel Saint-Susanne: French army commander on La Réunion, surrendered the island on terms.
Mr Satterly: Master in HMS Néréide
Mr Webber: Second lieutenant in HMS Néréide.
Hamelin: French commodore, based in the Vénus.
Duvallier: French commander in Port South East.
General Abercrombie: Commander of the invasion army, takes command over Keating.

Squadron leaders
Captain Pym: captain of HMS Sirius.
Lord Clonfert: Commander of HMS Otter and then post captain in HMS Néréide.
Mr Tomkinson: Lieutenant on HMS Otter who is made Master and Commander of Otter upon promotion of Clonfert to Néréide.
Captain Corbett: Captain of HMS Néréide and then HMS Africaine.
Captain Eliot: Captain in HMS Boadicea while Aubrey sailed in HMS Raisonable.
Captain Lambert: Captain of HMS Iphigenia.
Captain Lucius Curtis: Captain of HMS Magicienne who joined convoy after chasing Vénus, which took more merchant ships.
Lord Narborough (Garron): Captain of HMS Staunch, arrives during La Reunion action, was remembered as third in the Surprise (in prior novel HMS Surprise), but he was third in the Lively, the voyage afterward.
Mr Tom Pullings: Lieutenant under Aubrey earlier, he enters the action as Captain of troop ship Groper, then of Emma. He is now the father of a son, John.
Mr Fortescue: Captain of the schooner Wasp, and a man fond of birds, spent a long time with the albatross, shared specimens with Maturin after carrying him ashore on La Réunion.

Ships

The Squadron
HMS Boadicea 
[[HMS Raisonnable (1768)|HMS Raisonnable"]]- Ship of the line
HMS Sirius *
HMS Néréide *
HM Sloop Otter *
HMS Magicienne*
HMS Staunch * - brig
HMS Iphigenia *
HMS Africaine *
HMS Bombay *
Wyndham * - Indiaman used as transport once recapturedKite – transportSolebay – transportGroper – transportEmma – transport
HMS Leopard *Wasp – schooner
HMS Illustrious *

The French
Caroline * - frigate
Bellone * - frigate
Minerve * - frigate
Victor * - corvette
Ceylan * - captured British Indiaman
Wyndham  * - captured British Indiaman
Vénus * - frigate
Manche * - frigate
Astrée * - frigateHébé is the former HMS Hyaena (taken in the Atlantic)

 * N.B. were real ships during the period depicted.

Major themes

The novel gives further scope to Maturin's role as both a secret agent (in which he uses propaganda effectively to support the campaign) and as a naturalist (in which he is seen collecting relics of the extinct birds the dodo and the solitaire), while Aubrey experiences naval battles as the "looker-on" while others are directly in the fight. Aubrey makes the strategic decisions and knows the timing of when to act, but must learn how to manage other captains, not only the crew directly reporting to him. One theme is the contrast between Aubrey's development in his career and acceptance of what comes, to the insecurity of Clonfert, also a skilled seaman, who had been with him in the West Indies when neither had been "given his step" to commander or captain.

Walton comments that "The most interesting thing about this volume is Lord Clonfert, an Irish peer who feels the need to outdo everyone—his surgeon says at one point that if Jack is the dashing frigate captain, Clonfert has to be the dashing frigate captain to the power of ten. He’s ridiculous, he lies, but he is brave and does know the waters. And for once we hear Stephen and Jack discuss him, because he’s not a shipmate so Stephen doesn’t feel like an informer talking about him. He’s a psychological curiosity without any doubt, and O’Brian does him very well. There’s also the flogging Captain Corbett—so among his little fleet there’s one dandy and one tartar, and Jack has to try to manage them diplomatically."

Allusions to history and real persons
The military actions of the novel are very closely based upon the Mauritius campaign of 1809–1811 carried out by the Royal Navy in 1810 under Commodore Josias Rowley with the assistance of army forces under Harry Keating. O'Brian notes this in the preface. Réunion (Île Bourbon or Île Bonaparte) was taken completely in July 1810, and Mauritius (Île de France, earlier called Mauritius by the Dutch) was formally captured on 3 December 1810. Many of the names of people involved in that action are given to characters in the novel.

O'Brian used literary license in making Aubrey a Commodore while still a relatively junior captain, however this puts him equal in rank to the man who led the squadron in history, Commodore Rowley. In the novel, Aubrey was appointed directly by the Admiralty with the help of Maturin's persuasion, as Maturin had been at work on the intelligence side of the project. There are other differences from the historical event, one being that the French captain of the Vénus Hamelin survived the encounter, surrendering to the British, going on to honor in France. In contrast, Captain Corbett's reputation and death aboard ship match that of Robert Corbet, who was captain of Néréide and then given the Africaine when he brought the captured Caroline in to England. Lord Clonfert is fictional, in place of Nesbit Willoughby, who was captain of HMS Néréide; though Willoughby had a spotty career and took many wounds, he survived the battle and lived unmarried. Lord Clonfert takes the same splinter wound to the eye as Willoughby received. In the battle, Pym was taken prisoner by the French in the Battle of Grand Port in August 1810, released only when a later squadron from Cape Town re-took Île de la Passe in December 1810, freeing Pym and others taken prisoner. For the loss of his ship, Pym faced the usual court martial, and was exonerated of blame for the losses. In the novel, it is Captain Lord Clonfert who is left a prisoner in the action, seriously wounded, under the care of his own and French physicians until the squadron arrives under Admiral Bertie to accept the island's capitulation, but he does not live to face a court martial.

The ending of the novel, with Admiral Bertie sailing in and taking credit, in that way matches the historical event, as he led the squadron in December 1810. Some view that defeat as the most serious to the Royal Navy in the Napoleonic Wars; the interim defeat and very real loss of ships were cloaked in victory, as the islands were taken. The French mark their victory on the Arc de Triomphe, the only naval action noted there. Though Aubrey expects no baronetcy for his accomplishments in the novel, in history, both Admiral Bertie and Commodore Rowley received a baronetcy in recognition of their success in a popular military campaign.

A commodore indicated on which ship in his squadron he was sailing by showing his broad pendant (some editions have 'broad pennant').

Aubrey made the acquaintance at the Royal Society of Miss Caroline Herschel, famed astronomer and sister to William Herschel, and she aided him in the technique of polishing the lens for his telescope. She was in her sixties at the time period of the novel. In his development as a scientific sailor, Aubrey had presented a paper on his method for improving navigation by tracking the planets.

The island now called Réunion (French La Réunion) had several names in this era, including Île Bourbon and Île Bonaparte, reflecting the opposing sides in France. Bourbon was the name of the royal family deposed by the French Revolution and a way to refer to the royalists among the French; Napoleon Bonaparte was the emperor of the expanding French empire. The French ship Caroline was rechristened as HMS Bourbonnaise, both because there was already a ship named Caroline in the Royal Navy, and the island where she was taken had that as one of its names.

The story of the Russian Captain Golovnin aboard the ship Diana, caught at a British port when the national alliances had changed as he was sailing, refers to that historical situation, which occurred in the same year that the squadron to take the two French islands was assembled.

Allusions to literature
The story contains numerous allusions to the ideas and thinking of others. At one point Aubrey is recorded "adding, not without pride, Ex Africa surgit semper aliquid novo, – novi, eh?" ("Always something new coming out of Africa".) This is the popular version of a quotation from Pliny the Elder, "unde etiam vulgare Graeciae dictum semper aliquid novi Africam adferre"  Later Maturin quotes the Earl of Rochester, "Every man would be a coward if he durst" (which he would have seen in Samuel Johnson's Lives of the Most Eminent English Poets.) Throughout the novel there are allusions and quotes. including Alexander Pope, Pliny the Elder, Samuel Johnson, Horace, Lewis Carroll and from King Lear by Shakespeare.

Literary significance and criticism
"Taken together, the novels are a brilliant achievement. They display staggering erudition on almost all aspects of early nineteenth century life, with impeccable period detail....[Compared to Forester's characters] Aubrey and Maturin are subtler, richer items; in addition Patrick O'Brian has a gift for the comic which Forester lacks.Binyon, T J (24 June 1977) Review of The Mauritius command, New York Times literary supplement, cited in 

"Jack's assignment: to capture the Indian Ocean islands of Réunion and Mauritius from the French. That campaign forms the narrative thread of this rollicking sea saga. But its substance is more beguiling still..."  —Elizabeth Peer, Newsweek Kirkus Reviews found the language of the novel to be "shot through with unobtrusive culture and period texture that flows like a serenade".  The characters are drawn well, with "a crazy inner skip to their hearts," summing up the writing as having "the poetry of fact on blue-water currents under the trades."

Reviews published at the re-issue in 1991 were favorable and detailed.Publishers Weekly found O'Brian to be "a graceful writer, and the book is full of wonderful period details". The novel's "peculiar narrative structure" suggests climaxes that do not happen.

Richard Snow wrote in 1991 that he had read the novels from Master and Commander to Desolation Island from American publishers twenty years earlier. He enjoyed the happy ending of Master and Commander and was grateful for more, including "a complex and fascinating successor [which] appeared -- The Mauritius Command." O'Brian's "portrayal of life aboard a sailing ship is vivid and authoritative" and O'Brian presented "the lost arcana of that hard-pressed, cruel, courageous world with an immediacy that makes its workings both comprehensible and fascinating." He noted too that "behind the humor, behind the storms and the broadside duels . . . loomed something larger: the shape and texture of a whole era." As strong as the historical detail was, Snow remarked that "in the end it is the serious exploration of human character that gives the books their greatest power", and he also referred to the poetry of the writing, saying that O'Brian "manages to express, with the grace and economy of poetry, familiar things that somehow never get written down, as when he carefully details the rueful steps by which Stephen Maturin falls out of love." At this time of the re-issues of the novels by W W Norton in the US, Snow recommended that a reader start with the first and keep reading to the last one, then "You will have read what I continue to believe are the best historical novels ever written."

Kevin Myers wrote in The Irish Times that"O'Brian's sheer brilliance as a writer constantly dazzles, and his power over the reader is unique. No writer alive can move one as O'Brian can; no one can make you laugh so loud with hilarity, whiten your knuckles with unbearable tension or choke with emotion. He is the master."

Adaptations
From 3 April 2011 the BBC broadcast Roger Danes' dramatization of the book, in three one-hour parts, in the Classic Serial strand on BBC Radio 4. Produced and directed by Bruce Young, its cast was:
Captain Jack Aubrey – David Robb
Doctor Stephen Maturin – Richard Dillane
Governor Farquhar – David Rintoul
Lt-Col Keating – Thomas Arnold
Lord Clonfert – Sam Dale
Captain Corbett – Christian Rodska
Lt Seymour – Max Dowler
Midshipman George Johnson – Nyasha Hatendi
Dr McAdam/Admiral Bertie – Sean Baker
Captain Pym – Brian Bowles
Mrs Williams – Joanna Monro
Sophie – Sally Orrock

Publication history
1977, UK, Collins Publishers Hardcover First edition 
1978, May UK, Fontana Paperback 
1978, May USA, Stein & Day Hardcover edition 
1989, February UK, Fontana Paperback 
1991, May USA, W. W. Norton & Company Paperback Reprint edition 
1992, December USA, William A. Thomas Braille Bookstore Hardcover edition 
1993, April UK, ISIS Audio Books Audio book Patrick Tull (Narrator) 
1994, USA, W. W. Norton & Company Hardcover Reprint edition 
1996, September UK, Harper Collins Paperback 
1997, January UK, Harper Collins Audio book Robert Hardy (Narrator) 
2000, November USA, Thorndike Press Hardcover 
2001, March UK, Chivers Hardcover Large-print edition )
2001, November UK, Recorded Books Unabridged Patrick Tull (Narrator) 
2001, December UK, Chivers Paperback Large-print edition 
2002, September UK, Soundings Audio book (CD), Stephen Thorne (Narrator) 
2004, USA, Blackstone Audiobooks audio edition, August 2004, MP3 CD, Simon Vance (Narrator) 
2004, USA, Blackstone Audiobooks audio edition, August 2004, MP3 CD, Simon Vance (Narrator) 
2011, December USA, W. W. Norton & Company e-book 

This novel was first issued in the UK in 1977 by Collins and in 1978 in the US by Stein & Day. It was among the many re-issued in paperback by W W Norton in 1990–1991, 14 years after its initial publication by Collins (note list above). More reviewers read this book and others in the series, and the series gained a new audience.

The process of reissuing the novels prior to this novel and The Letter of Marque was in full swing in 1991, as the whole series gained a new and wider audience, as Mark Howowitz describes in writing about The Nutmeg of Consolation'', the fourteenth novel in the series and initially published in 1991.

Two of my favorite friends are fictitious characters; they live in more than a dozen volumes always near at hand. Their names are Jack Aubrey and Stephen Maturin, and their creator is a 77-year-old novelist named Patrick O'Brian, whose 14 books about them have been continuously in print in England since the first, "Master and Commander," was published in 1970.

O'Brian's British fans include T. J. Binyon, Iris Murdoch, A. S. Byatt, Timothy Mo and the late Mary Renault, but, until recently, this splendid saga of two serving officers in the British Royal Navy during the Napoleonic Wars was unavailable in this country, apart from the first few installments which went immediately out of print. Last year, however, W. W. Norton decided to reissue the series in its entirety, and so far nine of the 14 have appeared here, including the most recent chapter, The Nutmeg of Consolation.

Bibliography

References

External links
A Dramatization of the Novel by the BBC
The Patrick O'Brian Mapping Project: maps for HMS Boadicea
The Patrick O'Brian Mapping Project: maps for HMS Raisonable
 The Patrick O'Brian Mapping Project: maps for Dr Maturin

1977 British novels
Aubrey–Maturin series
Fiction set in 1810
Novels set in Mauritius
British Mauritius
William Collins, Sons books